Wilmslow High School is a mixed-sex 11–18 comprehensive secondary school in Wilmslow, Cheshire, England.  The school began in 1960 as a grammar school and gradually became a comprehensive school, becoming Wilmslow High School in 1991.

History

Grammar school

Wilmslow High School began life as the co-educational Wilmslow County Grammar School in September 1960 with 900 pupils. The new county grammar school was opened by Sir James Mountford, the Vice-Chancellor of the University of Liverpool, on 24 March 1961. It opened in 1964 and housed 750 girls. The school on Holly Road became an all-boys' school.

Comprehensive
Wilmslow Boys' Grammar School (Holly Road) became Harefield County High School when it became a sixth form-entry comprehensive in 1978, gradually becoming more comprehensive. Wilmslow Girls' Grammar School (Dean Row Road) became Dean Row County High School.  In the mid-1980s it became Wilmslow County High School, then Wilmslow High School in 1991. The school was designated a Specialist Sports College in September 2003 and subsequently re-designated in 2008 before the specialist schools programme ended in 2010.  Officially, the school is no longer a Specialist Sports College, despite still being advertised as such.

Other former schools in Wilmslow included Wilmslow County Secondary School for Girls on Wycliffe Avenue. When the Wycliffe Avenue Secondary Modern School closed, the girls moved to Thorngrove County High School, formally Hough Secondary Modern School for Boys. This school was originally opened in 1965 on Thorngrove Road – the land now occupied by the A34 bypass.  Later, all schools closed, leaving Wilmslow with one high school on the site of the original boys' grammar school.

Extracurricular activities
The school operates the Duke of Edinburgh's Award Scheme, and a bi-annual "World Challenge" expedition is available to older students, which for the last three years has been run through Camps International. Competitive sport is a feature of the school's extracurricular programme "Sports Xtra". In 2016, School Sport Magazine ranked the school 6th best sporting state school in the country.

Academic performance
The school is currently designated "good" by Ofsted, who reviewed the school in 2013; this is a drop from their previous position of "outstanding" in 2011. As of 2016, 75% of students achieve a C or better in both English and maths (compared to a national average of 59.3%), and the average A level grade attained by students is a C (equal to the national average). Although the school is below national average according to the government's "Progress 8" metric, they have an "Attainment 8" score above national average.

Learning support
The school's Learning Support provision includes an 8-place unit for children who have impaired hearing. The school is leading a Local Education Authority (LEA) project relating to provision for autistic students and the Autism Resource Provision Team won the Inspirational Education Provision award at the 2020 Autism Professional Awards.

Houses 
The school is spilt into two halves and four houses. Bollin and Harefield form half of the school while the Norcliffe and Thorngrove make up the other half, consequently students of the two halves are scheduled within classes together. Students wear ties according to their house colours. The name of the houses come from locations within the Wilmslow area.

Notable former pupils
 The 1975 – English Alternative/Indie Rock Band, met and started performing while attending here.
 Seren Bundy-Davies - Manchester-born Welsh/UK 400m runner
 Lee Dixon – former professional footballer.
 Doves – English Indie Rock Band, formed within Wilmslow High School. Their most popular song "Black and White Town" is a song referenced to that of Wilmslow town.
 Richard Fleeshman – Coronation Street actor and singer-songwriter.
 Johnny Gorman – Northern Ireland international footballer.
 Sarah Hadland – actress.
 John Harris – Guardian columnist. 
 Sam James - Sale Sharks and England Saxons rugby player

Wilmslow County Grammar School for Boys
 Andy Fanshawe, mountaineer
 Jem Finer, musician, and founding member of The Pogues who co-wrote Fairytale of New York, and son of Prof Samuel Finer (at Keele University and the University of Manchester)
 Rt Rev Michael Hill, Bishop of Bristol from 2003-17
 Prof Roger Matthews (archaeologist), Professor of Near Eastern Archaeology since 2011 at the University of Reading
 David Michaels, actor
 Chris Nicholl, footballer
 John Waite, Radio 4 investigative broadcaster, notably for Face the Facts

Wilmslow County Grammar School for Girls
 Fionnuala Ellwood, TV actress who played Lynn Whiteley in Emmerdale
 Jo Wheeler (not the sixth form), Sky News weather forecaster
 Barbara Wilshere, actress

Wycliffe Avenue School
 Terry Waite (for two years)

References

External links

 Schools in Wilmslow

Secondary schools in the Borough of Cheshire East
Educational institutions established in 1960
1960 establishments in England
Community schools in the Borough of Cheshire East
Wilmslow